The Ministry of Human Rights was a cabinet-level ministry within the government of Iraq between 2003 and 2015. The Ministry was created by the Coalition Provisional Authority when the Iraqi Governing Council was formed after the invasion of Iraq.

The Ministry interested of human rights propaganda, Saddam regime victims, victims of terrorism rights, martyrs rights, prisoners rights and mass graves in Iraq.

List of Ministers 
 Dr. Abdulbaseet Al-Hadithi (September 2003 – April 2004)
 Bakhtiar Amin (June 2004 – May 2005)
 Narmin Othman (May 2005 – 20 May 2006)
 Wijedan Salem (20 May 2006 – 21 December 2010)
 Mohammed Shia' Al Sudani (21 December 2010 – 18 October 2014)
 Mohammed Mahdi Ameen al-Bayati (18 October 2014 – 16 August 2015)
The ministry was removed from the Cabinet in August 2015 by Prime Minister Haider al-Abadi when he decreased the number of cabinet ministers in response to public demonstrations against corruption and government inefficiency.

Ministry Offices 

 The Minister Office
 The Deputy Minister of Administration Affairs Office
 The Deputy Minister of Research Affairs Office
 The General Inspector Office
 The National Center of Human Rights
 Humanity Affairs Department
 performance monitoring and protection of rights Department
 Media Center
 Relations and International Cooperation Department
 Administration and Financial affairs Department
 Legal Department 
 Governorates Affairs Department

References 

Human Rights
Iraq